The 2017 AFL season was the 121st season of the Australian Football League (AFL), the highest level senior men's Australian rules football competition in Australia, which was known as the Victorian Football League until 1989. The season featured eighteen clubs, ran from 23 March until 30 September, and comprised a 22-game home-and-away season followed by a finals series featuring the top eight clubs.

The premiership was won by the Richmond Football Club for the eleventh time, after it defeated  by 48 points in the 2017 AFL Grand Final.

Rule changes
The following amendments were made to the Laws of the Game for the 2017 season:
Rules relating to around-the-ground ruck contests were amended such that only the nominated ruckman for each team is permitted in the contest, eliminating the option for another player to enter the contest and take the tap, otherwise known as the "third man up" strategy. This was done to make ruck contests easier to adjudicate, to reduce the risk of injuries to ruckmen, and to increase the value of the skill of ruckwork.
A more stringent interpretation of deliberate rushed behinds was introduced, by allowing the umpire to consider prior opportunity, distance from the goal line and degree of applied pressure when judging whether or not to pay a free kick.
Adjustments were made to the interpretation of high tackles, giving the umpire more discretion to call play-on when he deems that the tackled player is responsible for the high contact. This was introduced to discourage the practice of ducking into a tackle, dropping the knees when tackled or trying to shrug off a tackle to earn a free kick.
A more stringent interpretation of punches to the body was introduced to the match review panel and tribunal to allow for suspensions to be imposed; and to allow fines to be imposed for low impact jumper punches.
The deliberate out of bounds free kick was amended, lowering the threshold for a free kick from 'intentionally' putting the ball out of bounds to 'not demonstrating sufficient intent' to keep the ball in bounds.

Pre-season

JLT Community Series

The pre-season series of matches returned in 2017 as the newly renamed JLT Community Series, which featured 27 practice matches played over 25 days, beginning on 16 February and ending on 12 March. The matches were stand-alone, with no overall winner of the series. Each team played three games, many at suburban or regional venues, while all games were televised on Fox Footy.

Premiership season
Notable features of the draw include:
The naming rights of York Park were bought by the University of Tasmania from Aurora Energy in the week prior to the full fixture being released, with the venue becoming known as the University of Tasmania Stadium.
 sold the naming rights for Manuka Oval during the AFL season to the University of New South Wales, and the stadium will be known as the UNSW Canberra Oval.
 and the  played in the AFL's first ever Good Friday match, which was played at Etihad Stadium.
 and  competed in the first AFL premiership match outside Australia and New Zealand when they played in round 8 at Jiangwan Stadium in Shanghai, China, with the match televised live on the Seven Network. Both teams had a bye the following round, while the remaining sixteen teams had their byes from rounds 11 to 13.
Owing to redevelopment, Simonds Stadium was unavailable until round 9.
The Western Bulldogs competed in the first AFL premiership match to be played at Mars Stadium in Ballarat when they faced  in round 22. The match was also the first AFL premiership match in a Victorian regional venue (other than Geelong) since a one-off round of promotional matches held in 1952.
All starting times are local.

Round 1

Round 2

Round 3

Round 4

Round 5

Round 6

Round 7

Round 8

Round 9

Round 10

Round 11

Round 12

Round 13

Round 14

Round 15

Round 16

Round 17

Round 18

Round 19

Round 20

Round 21

Round 22

Round 23

Season notes
The overall combined home and away attendance of 6,732,601 is the highest overall attendance for any home and away season, surpassing 2011's figure of 6,525,071.
 recorded the longest unbeaten start to a season in club history, winning its first six games.
  was the first reigning grand finalist in VFL/AFL history to lose its first six matches of the following season, before becoming the first club to reach the finals after starting the season with zero wins and six losses.
  became the first team since  in 2009 and the first team in the 18 team competition to fail to make the finals after winning the premiership the previous year and Hawthorn missed the finals for the first time since 2009.
  became the first team since  in 2011 to qualify for the finals after finishing wooden spooners the previous season.
It is the narrowest margin in VFL/AFL history to decide a finals spot.
 This was the last season in which games were played at Domain Stadium, with the Western Australian teams playing home games at Perth Stadium from 2018 and onwards.
's record of 15 wins, 1 draw and 6 losses is the least successful of any minor premier since 1997.
' record of 5 wins and 17 losses is the most successful of any wooden spooner since the Lions themselves in 1998.
 had the highest average home-and-away and home game attendance of any club in 2017, with figures of 46,580 and 55,958 respectively.

Win/loss table

Bold – Home game
X – Bye
Opponent for round listed above margin

Ladder

Ladder progression
Numbers highlighted in green indicates the team finished the round inside the top eight.
Numbers highlighted in blue indicates the team finished in first place on the ladder in that round.	
Numbers highlighted in red indicates the team finished in last place on the ladder in that round.
Underlined numbers indicates the team had a bye during that round.
Subscript numbers indicate ladder position at rounds end.

Positions of teams round by round

Finals series

Week one

Week two

Week three

Week four

Attendances

By club

By ground

Awards
The Brownlow Medal was awarded to Dustin Martin of  who polled a record 36 votes.
It was the fourth time Franklin has won the award. Franklin kicked ten goals in the final round to move above Josh Kennedy.

The AFL Players Association Awards
The Leigh Matthews Trophy was awarded to Dustin Martin of  polling 1,333 votes ahead of Patrick Dangerfield who polled 776.
The AFL Coaches Association Awards
The AFL Coaches Association Player of the Year Award was awarded to Dustin Martin of  who received 122 votes ahead of Patrick Dangerfield who received 118.
The Gary Ayres Award for the best player in the finals series was awarded to Dustin Martin of  who polled 25 votes ahead of teammate Trent Cotchin on 15.
The Allan Jeans Senior Coach of the Year Award was awarded to  coach Damien Hardwick.
The Assistant Coach of the Year Award was awarded to  assistant Rhyce Shaw.

The Lifetime Achievement Award was awarded to John Dimmer whose coaching career spanning 284 games included two flags apiece with West Australian clubs West Perth and South Fremantle.
The Best Young Player Award was awarded to Clayton Oliver of  who received 72 votes.
The Media Award was awarded to Gerard Whateley for the fourth consecutive year. 

Milestones

Coleman Medal
Numbers highlighted in blue indicates the player led the Coleman Medal at the end of that round.
Numbers underlined indicates the player did not play in that round.

Best and fairest

Club leadership

Coach changes

Club membership

Post-season

International Rules Series

The International Rules Series returned in November 2017, with Australia hosting two test matches. The series was played on an aggregate-points basis, with the winner being the team that scores the highest amount over the two test matches. The matches were played on 12 and 18 November 2017 at Adelaide Oval and Domain Stadium. The Australian team was again composed exclusively of players who have won All-Australian honours in their careers. The times and venues for the series were announced in August.

References

External links

Official AFL website
AFL Tables, Stats, Attendances, Records
More Extensive Stats, Attendances, Records of every club

Australian Football League seasons
 
2017 in Australian rules football